Siemiatycze  ( Siamiatyčy) is a town in eastern Poland, with 15,209 inhabitants (2004). It is the capital of Siemiatycze County in the Podlaskie Voivodeship.

History

The history of Siemiatycze dates back to the mid-16th century, when the village was part of the Podlasie Voivodeship of the Grand Duchy of Lithuania. In 1542, King Sigismund II Augustus granted town charter to Siemiatycze, and with the 1569 Union of Lublin, it passed to the Kingdom of Poland within the Polish–Lithuanian Commonwealth.

For centuries Siemiatycze remained property of several Polish-Lithuanian magnate families. The town, conveniently located along the Bug River, and near local administrative centers at Drohiczyn and Mielnik, became a popular market place, where farmers sold their produce. Disastrous Swedish invasion of Poland (1655-60) did not bring widespread destruction to Siemiatycze. The town continued to prosper, at the expense of other municipalities of the region of Podlachia, some of which burned to the ground by the Swedish, Transilvanian and Russian invaders.

In the 18th century, Siemiatycze was among most developed towns of the region. At that time it belonged to the Sapieha family, which founded the town hall, synagogue and other buildings. Noblewoman Anna Jabłonowska founded a midwifery institute, hospital, Christian monastery, palace with a museum and a new printing house. She also obtained a permission from the kings of Poland for the town to hold two annual fairs. In 1807 Siemiatycze was annexed by the Russian Empire, and during January Uprising, the Battle of Siemiatycze took place here, after which most of the town was destroyed, together with the Jabłonowski Palace, which has never been rebuilt. Following World War I, Poland regained independence and control of the town.

During the joint German-Soviet invasion of Poland, which started World War II in September 1939, Siemiatycze was invaded by Germany, which then handed it over to the Soviets in accordance with the Molotov–Ribbentrop Pact. The Soviets carried out arrests of prominent local Poles, including the town's mayor. The Soviet Union occupied the town until 1941, and afterwards it was occupied by Germany until 1944. Siemiatycze was to a large extent destroyed during the war, and its significant Jewish community was almost completely exterminated by Germans in the Holocaust. Several local Jews were hidden and rescued by Poles in nearby villages. After the war, the population of the town shrank to 4,000.

From 1975 to 1998, it was administratively located in the Białystok Voivodeship.

Sports
It competes in the lower leagues.

Notable people
 

Marek Antoni Nowicki (born 1953), human rights lawyer

International relations

Twin towns — Sister cities
Siemiatycze is twinned with:
 Castrolibero, Italy
 Zehdenick, Germany

References 

Cities and towns in Podlaskie Voivodeship
Siemiatycze County
Podlachian Voivodeship
Belsky Uyezd (Grodno Governorate)
Białystok Voivodeship (1919–1939)
Belastok Region
Holocaust locations in Poland